William "Rimmer" Brown was a footballer. His regular position was as a forward. He played for Newton Heath, Stalybridge Rovers, Chester, and Stockport County.

References

External links
MUFCInfo.com profile

Manchester United F.C. players
Stalybridge Rovers F.C. players
Chester City F.C. players
Stockport County F.C. players
English footballers
Association football forwards
Year of birth missing